The 1942 college football season was the 74th season of intercollegiate football in the United States.  Competition included schools from the Big Ten Conference, the Pacific Coast Conference (PCC), the Southeastern Conference (SEC), the Big Six Conference, the Southern Conference, the Southwestern Conference, and numerous smaller conferences and independent programs. The season was the first after the entry of the United States into World War II.

The teams ranked highest in the final Associated Press poll in December 1942 were:
 Ohio State - Ohio State won the Big Ten championship with a 9–1 record, its one loss coming against No. 3 Wisconsin. The Buckeyes ranked second nationally in scoring offense (33.7 points per game) and fourth in total offense (397.5 yards per game). They were ranked No. 1 in the final AP poll but did not appear in a bowl game. Gene Fekete led the Big Ten with 910 rushing yards. Ohio State was selected as national champions by the Associated Press (AP) poll.
 Georgia - Georgia won the SEC championship with an 11–1 record, including a victory over UCLA in the 1943 Rose Bowl. The Bulldogs ranked first nationally with 429.5 yards of total offense per game and were voted second in the final AP poll in December 1942, prior to the Rose Bowl. A majority of selectors (including Billingsley and Houlgate) later named the Bulldogs as the national champion. 
 Wisconsin - The Wisconsin Badgers finished second in the Big Ten with an 8–1–1 record, including a 17–7 victory over eventual AP national champion Ohio State. They were ranked No. 3 in the final AP poll. The Helms Athletic Foundation selected Wisconsin as 1942 national champions following the bowl games.
 Tulsa - Tulsa won the Missouri Valley Conference championship with a 10–1 record and was ranked No. 4 in the final AP poll. They ranked first nationally in scoring offense (39.5 points per game) and passing offense (233.9 yards per game). Glenn Dobbs ranked fourth nationally with 1,427 yards of total offense.
 Georgia Tech - The Georgia Tech Yellow Jackets finished second in the SEC and compiled a 9–2 record, including a loss to Texas in the 1943 Cotton Bowl. They were ranked No. 5 in the final AP poll.

Frank Sinkwich of Georgia won the Heisman Trophy and led the nation with 2,187 yards of total offense (including 1,392 passing yards), making him the first major-college player to tally more than 2,000 yards in a season.  Paul Governali of Columbia won the Maxwell Award. The year's other statistical leaders included Rudy Mobley of Hardin-Simmons with 1,281 rushing yards, Ray Evans of Kansas with 1,117 passing yards, Harding Miller of SMU with 531 receiving yards, and Bob Steuber] of Missouri with 121 points scored.

With large numbers of college and professional football players serving in the armed forces, "service teams" competed against the college teams. The top-ranked service teams were Great Lakes Navy (No. 1), Iowa Pre-Flight (No. 2), and Georgia Pre-Flight (No. 3).

Conference and program changes

Conference changes
The Nebraska Intercollegiate Athletic Association, which had been active since 1928, played its final season in 1942. The Northern Teachers Athletic Conference, an active NCAA Division II conference now known as the Northern Sun Intercollegiate Conference, changed its name to the State Teacher's College Conference of Minnesota.

Membership changes

September
On September 19, in Louisville, Georgia defeated Kentucky, 7–6.  The following Friday, Georgia defeated the Jacksonville Naval Air Station, 14–0, in Macon.  The soldiers at the Flight School at the University of Iowa, organized as the Iowa Pre-Flight Seahawks, overwhelmed Kansas, 61–0.

Most schools got their seasons underway on September 26. Defending champion Minnesota beat Pittsburgh, 50–7.  Duke beat Davidson 21–0.  Notre Dame and Wisconsin played to a 7–7 tie in Madison.  Illinois beat South Dakota 46–0.  In Montgomery, Alabama beat South Louisiana Institute (later University of Louisiana at Lafayette), 54–0.  Texas beat the Corpus Christi Naval Air Station, 18–7.  Michigan beat the Great Lakes Naval Training Station, 9–0.  Before its smallest crowd since 1933 (22,555) Ohio State defeated a service team, the Fort Knox Armoraiders, 59–0.  Iowa Pre-Flight won again, at Northwestern, 20–12.

October
October 3

Minnesota's winning streak ended when the defending national champs lost their first game in almost four years, to the Seahawks of Iowa Pre-Flight (who just happened to be coached that season by "former" Minnesota head coach Bernie Bierman who had taken leave from Minnesota to serve as an officer in the military during World War II), 7–6.  Ohio State beat Indiana 32–21.  Michigan beat Michigan State 20–0.  Illinois defeated Butler 67–0.  Texas beat LSU 27–14.  Notre Dame lost to Georgia Tech 13–6.  Georgia defeated Furman 40–7.  Alabama beat Mississippi State 21–6.  Duke lost at Wake Forest, 20–7.

October 10

Minnesota lost at Illinois, 20–13. Ohio State beat visiting USC, 28–12.  Michigan lost to Iowa Pre-Flight, 26–14.  Georgia beat Ole Miss, 48–13, at Memphis.  In Mobile, Alabama defeated the Pensacola NAS, 27–0.  Texas lost at Tulane, 18–7.  In the poll that followed, the Top Five consisted of three teams from the Big Nine (No. 1 Ohio State, No. 3 Michigan, and No. 5 Illinois) and two from the SEC (No. 2 Georgia and No. 4 Alabama).

October 17

No. 1 Ohio State beat Purdue 26–0.  No. 2 Georgia beat Tulane 40–0.  No. 3 Michigan defeated Northwestern 34–16.  In Birmingham, No. 4 Alabama beat No. 15 Tennessee, 8–0.  No. 5 Illinois won at No. 19 Iowa, 12–7.  Losing also that day was Iowa Pre-Flight, which sustained its first loss at Notre Dame, 28–0.

In the next poll, the Top Five shuffled slightly, with Alabama and Michigan trading places: Ohio State (No. 1), Georgia (No. 2), Alabama (No. 3), Michigan (No. 4), Illinois (No. 5).

October 24

No. 1 Ohio State won at Northwestern 20–6.  No. 2 Georgia won at Cincinnati 35–13.  No. 3 Alabama won at Kentucky, 14–0.  No. 4 Michigan lost at No. 13 Minnesota, 16–14.  No. 5 Illinois lost to No. 8 Notre Dame, 21–14.  No. 6 Georgia Tech won at Navy, 21–0.

In the poll that followed, Notre Dame and Georgia Tech replaced Michigan and Illinois: Ohio State (No. 1), Georgia (No. 2), Alabama (No. 3), Notre Dame (No. 4), Georgia Tech (No. 5).

October 31

No. 1 Ohio State lost at No. 6 Wisconsin, 17–7.  In Atlanta, No. 2 Georgia beat No. 3 Alabama, 21–10.  No. 4 Notre Dame beat Navy in Cleveland, 9–0.  No. 5 Georgia Tech won at Duke, 26–7.  No. 7 Boston College beat Georgetown, 47–0.  The Georgia Bulldogs took over first place in the poll that followed, and Wisconsin and Boston College moved in while Ohio State and Alabama fell out: 1. Georgia 2. Wisconsin 3. Georgia Tech 4. Notre Dame 5. Boston College.

November
November 7

In Jacksonville, No. 1 Georgia beat Florida, 75–0.  No. 2 Wisconsin lost at unranked Iowa, 6–0. No. 3 Georgia Tech beat Kentucky 47–7.  No. 4 Notre Dame beat Army 13–0 at Yankee Stadium.  No. 5 Boston College beat Temple, 28–0.  No. 8 Alabama beat South Carolina 29–0 and moved into the Top Five as Wisconsin dropped out.  The nation's top two teams were Georgia and Georgia Tech: Georgia (No. 1), Georgia Tech (No. 2), Boston College (No. 3), Notre Dame (No. 4), Alabama (No. 5).

November 14

No. 1 Georgia won at Chattanooga, 40–0.  In Atlanta, No. 2 Georgia Tech beat No. 5 Alabama 7–0.  No. 3 Boston College beat Fordham at home, 56–6.  No. 4 Notre Dame lost to No. 6 Michigan, 32–20, while in Cleveland, No. 10 Ohio State beat No. 13 Illinois 44–20.  The poll: Georgia (No. 1), Georgia Tech (No. 2), Boston College (No. 3), Michigan  (No. 4), Ohio State (No. 5).

November 21

In Columbus, Georgia, No. 1 Georgia lost to unranked Auburn, 27–13.  No. 2 Georgia Tech beat Florida 20–7.  No. 3 Boston College defeated Boston University, 37–0.  No. 4 Michigan and No. 5 Ohio State met in Columbus, with OSU winning 21–7, capturing the Big Nine championship.  No. 7 Wisconsin beat No. 10 Minnesota 21–6 to finish its season at 8–1–1.  In the next poll, the Boston College Eagles were No. 1: Boston College (No. 1), Georgia Tech (No. 2), Ohio State (No. 3), Wisconsin (No. 4), Georgia (No. 5).

November 28

No. 1 Boston College lost to unranked Holy Cross, 55–12.  No. 2 Georgia Tech visited No. 5 Georgia, and lost 34–0.  No. 3 Ohio State defeated the Iowa Pre-Flight Seahawks, 41–12, finishing 9–1–0 and capturing the No. 1 ranking in the final AP poll, ahead of No. 2 Georgia, No. 3 Wisconsin, No. 4 Tulsa, and No. 5 Georgia Tech.

Conference standings

Major conference standings

Independents

Minor conferences

Minor conference standings

Rankings

Top 10 in final AP poll
	
1.	Ohio State (9–1)
2.	Georgia (10–1)
3.	Wisconsin (8–1–1)
4.	Tulsa (10–0)
5.	Georgia Tech (9–1)
6.	Notre Dame (7–2–1)
7.	Tennessee (8–1–1)
8.	Boston College (8–1)
9.	Michigan (7–3)
10.	Alabama (7–3)

Heisman Trophy voting
The Heisman Trophy is given to the year's most outstanding player

Bowl games

Statistical leaders

Team leaders

Total offense

Total defense

Rushing offense

Rushing defense

Passing offense

Passing defense

Scoring

Individual leaders

Total offense

Rushing

Passing

See also
 1942 College Football All-America Team
 List of World War II military service football teams

References